Snettisham Airport is a publicly owned, private-use aircraft facility near the Snettisham Hydroelectric Project in Snettisham, Alaska.  It is managed by Alaska Electric Light & Power.

References

Airports in Alaska
Transportation buildings and structures in Juneau, Alaska